The men's football tournament at the 2015 Military World Games was held in Mungyeong in South Korea from 30 September to 10 October.

Squads

Group stage

Group A

Group B

Knockout stage

Classification 7–8

Third place match

Classification 9–10

Classification 5–6

Final

Final ranking

Best scorers
5 goals
  Abdulaziz Al-Muqbali

4 goals
  Hossam Salama
  Omar Ali

3 goals

  Lamine Abid
  Maâmar Youcef
  Alaa-Eddine Aly
  Jo Dong-kun
  Justice Odoi

2 goals

  Oussama Darfalou
  Okacha Hamzaoui
  Claude Gusma do Nascimento
  Endson Rosendo Patriota
  Richardson Santos de Almeida
  Maged Mohamed
  Ibrahim Salah
  Ahmed Temsah
  Jean-Charles Fernandez
  Kim Do-yup
  Lee Seung-gi
  Lee Chang-hoon
  Park Jin-po
  Said Al-Abdul Salam
  Ismail Al-Ajmi
  Said Al-Dhabouni
  Ahmed Al-Mukhaini
  Trent Brown

1 goal

  Mohamed Belhadi
  Mohamed Benkablia
  Faouzi Yaya
  Heider de Paula dos Santos
  Ronaldo Costa da Silva
  Liam Michael Chambers
  Jeffrey Copoc
  Arafa El-Sayed
  Ahmed Shadid
  Kevin Dumontant
  Romain Magnier
  Yann Oggad
  Ibrahima Kassory Camara
  Sékou Camara
  Aly Sylla
  Kim Oh-kyu
  Kim Sung-hwan
  Yong Lee
  Park Jin-po
  Park Gi-dong
  Al Abd Al Nofli
  Basel Al-Rawahi
  Khamis Daiq
  Saud Abdallah
  Mamadou Diallo
  Etienne Ebanda
  Kyle Portiea Baker
  Christopher Krueger
  Ian Schinelli

Own goal
  Ivan Yaruk (playing against Oman)
  Asaad Al-Yahmadi (playing against Egypt)

External links
Football competition summary - Official website of the 2011 Military World Games

Football Men
Military World Games
2015 men
2015 men